Michel P. Fribourg (1913 – 10 April 2001) was a Belgian-born Jewish-American billionaire businessman, the chairman and CEO of Continental Grain, a global agribusiness and food company founded by Simon Fribourg in Arlon, Belgium in 1813. In his New York Times obituary, he was called "certainly the premier figure in world trade in food of the 20th century".

Early life
Fribourg was born in Antwerp and educated in France.

Career
He worked all of his life for Continental Grain a company owned by his family, rising to chairman and CEO.

In 1944, following the death of his father, he became the fifth generation of Fribourgs to lead Continental Grain.

In 1998, Forbes estimated his net worth at $2.4 billion, based on his ownership of Continental Grain and 75% of ContiFinancial.

Personal life
He was married to Mary Ann.

They had five children, sons Robert Fribourg, Paul J. Fribourg, Charles Fribourg,  Nadine Newman and Caroline Rosen.

He died in New York on 10 April 2001.

References

1913 births
2001 deaths
American billionaires
American people of Belgian-Jewish descent
20th-century American businesspeople
20th-century American Jews
Belgian businesspeople
Belgian emigrants to the United States
Belgian Jews